Rot Weiss Ahlen is a German football club based in Ahlen, North Rhine-Westphalia. Until 2006 the club was known as LR Ahlen for its major sponsor, but underwent a name change when the sponsor withdrew its support after the team was relegated to the Regionalliga (III) in that year.

History
The club has its roots in the local sides of the early 1900s formed by coalminers who played pickup games after work. In 1917, Freie Sportclub Union (FSCU) Ahlen was founded and became one of the region's best known teams, playing in the second tier leagues of the time. The rise of the Third Reich saw the club disbanded as over three-quarters of its members were foreigners making the side politically unpalatable to the regime. A new club, Tus Germania Ahlen, was formed in 1933. This side merged with the strong local club Wacker Ahlen to create the town's largest sports association.

After World War II attempts to rebuild local teams failed until members of eight pre-war clubs came together to form Turn- und Sport Ahlen in 1948. The new side went on to many decades of routine play in the local upper leagues. In 1991, TuS were faced with a financial crisis and demotion to lower level play. A local benefactor, Helmut Spikker, helped bail the team out through the support provided by his firm, cosmetics manufacturer LR International.

Now on a firm footing, TuS Ahlen enjoyed an impressive run of success through the early 90s beginning with a Berzirksliga Westfalen (VII) title in 1992 and promotion to the Landesliga Westfalen (VI). In each of the following three seasons TuS earned another championship and promotion; out of the Landesliga, through the Verbandsliga Westfalen-Nordost (V) and Oberliga Westfalen (IV), leading to the Regionalliga West/Südwest (III).

Leichtathletik Rasensport Ahlen was formed on 1 June 1996 when TuS Ahlen merged with Blau-Weiß Ahlen to begin play in the Regionalliga West/Südwest in 1996–97. The club's rise was stalled and they made a bid to again move up by signing a number of players with Bundesliga experience for 1998–99. However, they could only manage a sixth-place finish and subsequently unloaded their expensive talent. Living more within their means, the side earned promotion with a second-place result in 1999–2000 and a 2–1 victory over 1. FC Union Berlin in the playoff round to advance to the 2. Bundesliga. Ahlens best result came in their debut in the second tier when they ended sixth. The team slipped to become a lower tier side and lingered for another five seasons before a 17th-place result led to their demotion in 2006.

After being relegated LR Ahlen lost the support of its major sponsor and underwent a name change to become Rot Weiss Ahlen on 31 May 2006. Chairman Spikker also left the club at the end of August with his successor being vice-president Heinz-Jürgen Gosda. The team returned to 2. Bundesliga play after finishing as champions of the Regionalliga Nord in 2007–08. With the end of the 2009–10 season, Ahlen was relegated to the 3. Liga, and the following year to the fifth NRW-Liga despite a 17th-place finish outside the drop down zone because of insolvency.

In 2020 the club finished second in the Oberliga Westfalen to win promotion to the Regionalliga West.

Recent seasons

Honours
The club's honours:
 Regionalliga Nord Champions: 2008
 Oberliga Westfalen Champions: 1996
 Runners-up: 2015, 2020
 Verbandsliga Westfalen Nordost
 Champions: 1995
 Landesliga Westfalen Champions: 1994
 Bezirksliga Westfalen'
 Champions: 1993

Current squad

Former managers
 1992 – 30 June 1996 Joachim Krug
 1 July 1996 – 18 August 1997 Wolfgang Sandhowe
 19 August 1997 – 13 October 1998 Klaus Berge
 14 October 1998 – 11 September 2000 Franz-Josef Tenhagen
 20 September 2000 – 27 November 2001 Peter Neururer
 30 November 2001 – 24 November 2002 Uwe Rapolder
 25 November 2002 – 2 January 2003 Uwe Fuchs
 3 January 2003 – 25 May 2003 Werner Lorant
 3 August 2003 – 14 November 2003 Stefan Kuntz
 24 November 2003 – 1 March 2005 Ingo Peter
 7 March 2005 – 25 October 2005 František Straka
 26 October 2005 – 14 May 2006 Paul Linz
 15 May 2006 – 29 October 2006 Bernard Dietz
 30 October 2006 – 30 June 2007 Heiko Bonan
 1 July 2007 – 3 March 2009 Christian Wück
 3 March 2009 – 16 April 2009 Bernd Heemsoth
 16 April 2009 – 20 September 2009 Stefan Emmerling
 20 September 2009 – 14 October 2009 Andreas Zimmermann
 14 October 2009 – 30 June 2010 Christian Hock
 1 July 2010 – 30 June 2011 Arie van Lent
 1 July 2011 – 15 November 2011 Thomas Berndsen
 21 November 2011 – 2 April 2012 Joachim Krug
 5 April 2012 – 30 June 2012 Peter Feldkötter
 1 July 2013 – 30 June 2013 Marco Antwerpen
 1 July 2013 – 14 April 2014 Carlos Castilla
 14 April 2014 – 18 May 2016 Marco Antwerpen
 1 July 2016 – 17 October 2016 Mircea Onisemiuc
 17 October 2016 – 24 October 2016 André Kruphölter
 24 October 2016 – 15 December 2017 Erhan Albayrak
 4 January 2018 – 13 September 2018 Michael Schrank
 10 October 2018 – 30 June 2020 Christian Britscho
 1 July 2020 – 16 November 2020 Björn Mehnert
 16 November 2020 – Present Andreas Zimmermann

External links
 Official website 
 The Abseits Guide to German Soccer

 
Football clubs in Germany
Football clubs in North Rhine-Westphalia
1996 establishments in Germany
Association football clubs established in 1996
Warendorf (district)
2. Bundesliga clubs
3. Liga clubs